Montenerodomo is a comune and town in the Province of Chieti in the Abruzzo region of Italy. The remote mountain hill town lies within the Maiella National Park.

Montenerodomo is the birthplace of Tommaso F. D'Alessandro, father of former Baltimore mayor Thomas D'Alesandro Jr., and grandfather of Nancy Pelosi, Speaker of the United States House of Representatives.

See also
Juvanum

References